Love in an Apartment Hotel is a 1913 American drama film directed by  D. W. Griffith and starring Blanche Sweet.

Cast
 Blanche Sweet - The Young Woman
 Adolph Lestina - The Young Woman's Father
 Henry B. Walthall - The Young Woman's Fiancé
 Harry Carey - The Thief
 Mae Marsh - Angelina Millingford, a Maid
 Edward Dillon - Pinky Doolan, a Bellboy
 Robert Harron - The Desk Clerk
 Kate Toncray - Head Chambermaid
 Jack Pickford - A Bellhop
 Clara T. Bracy - A Maid
 John T. Dillon - One of the Fiancé's Friends
 Walter Miller - One of the Fiancé's Friends
 Gertrude Bambrick - In Hotel Lobby
 Lionel Barrymore - In Hotel Lobby
 Kathleen Butler - The Young Woman's Maid
 Hattie Delaro - In Hotel Lobby (unconfirmed)
 Frank Evans - First Hotel Detective
 Harry Hyde - In Hotel Lobby
 J. Jiquel Lanoe - In Hotel Lobby
 Walter P. Lewis - In Hotel Lobby
 Joseph McDermott - The Fiancé's Valet
 W. C. Robinson - Second Hotel Detective
 Matt Snyder - In Hotel Lobby (as Matt B. Snyder)

See also
 Harry Carey filmography
 D. W. Griffith filmography
 Blanche Sweet filmography
 Lionel Barrymore filmography

References

External links

1913 films
Films directed by D. W. Griffith
1913 short films
American silent short films
Biograph Company films
American black-and-white films
1913 drama films
Silent American drama films
1910s American films